Holderness was launched in 1789 at Selby, Yorkshire. She made one voyage for the British East India Company (EIC) in 1794–95. She then became a West Indiaman until 1801 when a new owner used her as a Greenland whaler. In 1806 two French warships captured and burnt her.

Career
Lloyd's Register for 1790 lists Holderness with W. Wray, master, P. Green, owner, and trade Hull—St Petersburg.

On 14 September 1792 Lloyd's List reported that Holderness, Wray, master, had run onshore on the Holm Sand while sailing from New York to Hull. She was gotten off with little damage.

EIC voyage (1794-1795): The EIC had Hill repair and measure Holderness prior to chartering her for one voyage to India. Captain George Wright acquired a letter of marque on 14 May 1794. He then sailed from the Downs on 11 June, bound for Bengal. Holderness arrived at Calcutta on 23 November. She left Bengal on 18 February 1795, was at Madras on 3 March, and reached Saint Helena on 24 May. She reached Shannon and arrived at the Downs on 15 October.

Greenland whaler

On 4 March 1803 Lloyd's List (LL) reported that Holderness and  had been on their way to Davis Strait when they had had to put back to Hull having lost anchors and cables, and having sustained other damage.

Fate
The French burnt their captures.

Citations and references
Citations

References
 
 

1789 ships
Age of Sail merchant ships of England
Ships of the British East India Company
Whaling ships
Maritime incidents in 1792
Maritime incidents in 1803
Maritime incidents in 1806
Captured ships
Scuttled vessels
Ship fires
Shipwrecks